Opus albarium is the Latin name for a refined type of plasterwork used in the interiors of houses, consisting of a special stucco incorporating marble dust, then beaten compact with rammers: the technique is described by Vitruvius (VII.3.4-11). Varro states (R.R. I.59.2) that such wall coatings make buildings cooler.

Roman construction techniques
Plastering
Wallcoverings